Straphanger may mean:

Transit passengers
 Straphanger (specifically), a standing passenger on a subway or bus
 Straphanger (more generally), a commuter who uses public transportation

Other uses
Straphanger, a free rider who benefits from the actions and exertions of someone else, with no efforts of their own
 Straphangers Campaign, a New York City-based transit interest group
The Straphanger, a 1922 comedy short film directed by Fred Fishback
The Straphanger Saloon, a saloon in Hackensack, New Jersey
Straphanger, an experienced United States Army airborne paratrooper who is not scheduled to jump today but is on standby